Shailesh Thapa Chhetri was the 28th Inspector General of Nepal Police. He was appointed as the Chief of Nepal Police after succeeding Thakur Prasad Gyawaly on 9 July 2020 following a cabinet decision. He joined Nepal Police as an Inspector on May 1, 1992.

On 26 December 2021, he attended the meeting of the Central Security Committee which was related to the upcoming National Assembly election and overall situation of law and order in the country. He attended an Interpol meeting at Turkey on 21 November 2021.

Mr. Chhetri was succeeded by Dhiraj Pratap Singh as the I.G.P on 3rd May, 2022.

References

Nepalese police officers
Inspectors General of Police (Nepal)
Living people
1968 births